Krivaja is a village in the municipality of Šabac, Serbia. According to the 2002 census, the village has a population of 952 people. The Church of the Transfiguration was built in 1790.

References

Populated places in Mačva District